The Turkmenistan men's national volleyball team represents Turkmenistan in international volleyball competitions and friendly matches. The team is currently ranked 131st in the world.

References

V
National men's volleyball teams
Volleyball in Turkmenistan
Men's sport in Turkmenistan